5th Regiment or 5th Infantry Regiment may refer to:

Infantry regiments
 5th Aviation Regiment (Australia), a unit of the Australian Army 
 2/5th Armoured Regiment (Australia), a unit of the Australian Army 
 5th Foot Guards (German Empire), a unit of the Imperial German Army 
 5th Infantry Regiment (Greece), a unit of the Greek Army
 5th Archipelago Regiment, a unit of the Greek Army
 5/42 Evzone Regiment, a unit of the Greek Army
 5th Guards Grenadiers, a unit of the Imperial German Army 
 5th Regiment of Foot, a unit of the British Army 
 5th Dragoon Guards, a unit of the British Army 
 5th Bengal European Regiment, a unit of the British East India Company 
 5th Marine Regiment (United States), a unit of the United States Marine Corps 
 5th Infantry Regiment (United States), a unit of the United States Army 
 Fifth Regiment, a unit loyal to the Spanish republic at the beginning of the Spanish Civil War

American Revolutionary War regiments
 5th Continental Regiment
 5th Connecticut Regiment
 5th Maryland Regiment
 5th Massachusetts Regiment
 5th New York Regiment
 5th North Carolina Regiment
 5th Pennsylvania Regiment
 5th South Carolina Regiment
 5th Virginia Regiment

American Civil War regiments
 5th Iowa Volunteer Infantry Regiment
 5th Michigan Volunteer Infantry Regiment
 5th Minnesota Volunteer Infantry Regiment
 5th New York Veteran Volunteer Infantry Regiment
 5th United States Colored Infantry Regiment
 5th West Virginia Volunteer Infantry Regiment
 5th Wisconsin Volunteer Infantry Regiment
 5th Missouri Infantry Regiment (disambiguation)

Artillery regiments
 5th Medium Regiment, Royal Canadian Artillery, a unit of the Canadian Army 
 5th Regiment Royal Artillery, a unit of the United Kingdom Army
 5th (British Columbia) Field Regiment, Royal Canadian Artillery, a unit of the Canadian Army

Cavalry regiments
 5th Cavalry Regiment, a unit of the United States Army 
5th Lithuanian Vanguard Regiment

American Civil War regiments
 5th Regiment Illinois Volunteer Cavalry
 5th Regiment Iowa Volunteer Cavalry
 5th Michigan Volunteer Cavalry Regiment
 5th West Virginia Volunteer Cavalry Regiment

Other regiments
 5th Air Reconnaissance Regiment, a unit of Yugoslav Air Force
 5th Royal Tank Regiment, an armoured unit of the United Kingdom Army

See also
 5th Corps (disambiguation)
 5th Army (disambiguation)
 5th Division (disambiguation)
 5th Brigade (disambiguation)
 5th Group (disambiguation)
 5th Squadron (disambiguation)